Tobi 9 - Coptic Calendar - Tobi 11

The tenth day of the Coptic month of Tobi, the fifth month of the Coptic year. On a common year, this day corresponds to January 5, of the Julian Calendar, and January 18, of the Gregorian Calendar. This is the last day of the Coptic season of Peret, the season of emergence. This day is the Paramoun of the Feast of the Theophany.

Commemorations

Saints 

 The departure of Saint Justus, the disciple of Saint Samuel the Confessor

Other commemorations 

 The Paramoun of the Feast of the Theophany

References 

Days of the Coptic calendar